New Cassettes were an English five piece indie rock band from Northampton, England, formed in 2005.

History
New Cassettes were a five-piece band formed in 2005.  The band's debut album 'The Art of...' was released in 2009, with second album Winterhead, following in March 2012 through N13/MTV.  They gained critical acclaim from plays on Radio 1, BBC6 and XFM, and have been MySpace and Radio 1 featured artists.  The band toured in support of The Strokes, played Glastonbury Festival, and have been featured on The Inbetweeners Soundtrack" along with a headlining tour in Japan.

Beginnings
The band released their debut single, "You Won't Stop" on Fantastic Plastic-with copies selling out within the first month and landing number at No. 11 in the indie charts in England. Their first single, "You Won't Stop" was issued on Fantastic Plastic, the follow-up, "Recover/Retreat" released on Maps' Last Space Recordings label. Third single 'Hearts Don't Beat Right', was released in 2008.

Two songs ("Carnivals" and "You Won't Stop"), were featured on the Channel 4 comedy, The Inbetweeners. Their debut album The Art Of... was released in 2009 in the UK on New Label, New Danger and in Japan under the Pony Up imprint.

New Cassettes finished the final mixing of their second album, Winterhead, with Grammy Award-winning songwriter and producer Adam Schlesinger of Fountains of Wayne and sound engineer Geoff Sanoff in October 2010. While in the States working on the album the band took a break from the studio to do a special ASCAP-hosted showcase for TV and movie executives at the Gibson Showroom in Los Angeles. The show was a success. MTV became fans of the New Cassettes after their short stop in Los Angeles, and asked them to join the new 'HYPE' venture between MTV and Extreme Music.

 Members
 Tom Stubbs - vocals
 Nikolas Gray - guitar & vocals
 Owen Reed - guitar & vocals
 Dan Battison - bass & vocals

 Former members 
Tommy Francis - Drums
Ed Hoare - Drums

 Discography 
 Studio albums The Art Of... (June 2010)Winterhead (March 2012)

 EPs Ep1 (April 2012)Ep2'' (August 2012)

Singles 
"You Wont Stop" / "Yeah" (August 2007)
"Recover/Retreat" / "I'm Always Right" (March 2008)
"Hearts Don't Beat Right" (September 2008)
"Silent Guns" (May 2011)
"Bite Your Lip" (October 2012)

Music videos

Films

References

External links
 Website
 HypeMusic
BBC Northampton feature - "On Tour With... New Cassettes"
Photographs of New Cassettes performing at Summer Sundae 2006
Quirky Motion films featuring New Cassettes

English indie rock groups
Musical groups established in 2005